Copycat, in comics, may refer to:

 Copycat (Marvel Comics), a mutant superhero
 Copycat, a comic book character in The Magic Comic

See also
Copycat (disambiguation)